Igbe religion, popularly known as Igbe (an Urhobo word meaning dance) was founded by Ubiecha Etarakpo in 1858 and has its headquarters at 11, Egbo Street, Kokori Inland, Ethiope East Local Government Area, Delta State, Nigeria.

The holy (sacred) day is known as Edigbe, meaning the day of joy.

It is a religion based on dance, as its medium of worship to God. It began as a Urhobo-Kokori traditional sect, and in the 20th century was influenced by an influx of Christian evangelism.

Originating in Kokori, it gradually spread in Urhobo nation and austral Nigeria at large.

Beliefs

The adherents of the Igbe religion are monotheists who believe in an omnipresent, omnipotent, omniscient and omnibenevolent God called Oghene and that he rewards the good and evil alike, according to their deeds.

Dance is a core element of the Igbe. The adherents believe that by dancing, they draw on themselves the very hand of the one and only monotheistic God.

Worship

As dancing is a core element of the Igbe, there is no worship session without dancing. They sing native Urhobo songs in place of hymns. At worship services, the Igbe priest(s), always dressed in a white dress and white headgears, administer(s) native chalk on the worshippers for their protection.

Fellow Igbe worshippers dress in white attires too, with their neck powdered in white and them carrying basins and small stools. When the native drums beat, they sway left and right in a dance, as though possessed by a deity.

The Igbe religion celebrates an annual feast, Ore Isi, for twelve days. It takes place every May, with thousands are in attendance.

History

Igbe was founded in 1858, in Kokori Nigeria. Ubiecha Etarakpo allegedly saw an apparition of two divine beings who "anointed" him to preach against immorality and witchcraft. After the alleged apparition, Ubiecha became eccentric and acted insanely as no day passed without him dancing. This scared the people from coming close. It was also alleged that after the alleged apparition, Ubiecha performed amazing miracles, accurately predicted the future, healed the sick and miraculously identified witches. He built a worship house called 'ogua' in his compound and, from there, ministered to the people with native white chalk; and, allegedly prophesied with stunning accuracy. This brought people from across the Urhobo country to Kokori. Ubiecha died in 1920, after gaining fame and wealth

Divisions

After Ubiecha's death and burial. His children became divided over succession. By tradition, his eldest son, Ibodje Ubiecha succeeded his father as chief priest and head prophet; but his half brother, Akpokovo Ubiecha, established his own branch in Kokori. One of Ibodje's daughters, Mary Ibodje, a priestess, also broke away to establish her own branch before Ibodje death in 1986. Mcdonald Ibodje, his eldest son, succeeded him. Ref Joshua Ibodje

Syncretism

With the influx of Christianity into Kokori in the 20th century, the Igbe was influenced by the presence and works of the Christian Church's evangelism. Another Igbe organisation was founded by Chief Ogbevire Ogogo. This Igbe sect was infused with some elements of Christianity. They observed Christmas and New Year holidays coupled with the Igbe core festival. It gained recognition and spread in Delta, Edo, Ondo, Rivers and Lagos states of Nigeria.

Demographics

Though the Igbe extends beyond Urhobo land, the bulk of adherents remain Urhobo people and the principal medium of communication is largely the Urhobo language.

Criticism

Igbe has been criticized for rejecting conventional medical treatment. Igbe adherents believe and administer the native chalk for treatment of ailments. This has been viewed as dangerous. There have been objections to the principal utilization of Urhobo language at worship sessions, and it has been criticized as a religion of idol worship.

References

Traditional African religions
Monotheistic religions